The 2011 Vancouver Island Shootout was held from November 11 to 13 at the Juan de Fuca Curling Club in Victoria, British Columbia as part of the 2011–12 World Curling Tour. The purses for the men's and women's events will be CAD$10,500 and CAD$10,000, respectively.

Men

Teams

A Event

B Event

C Event

Playoffs

Women

Teams

Round Robin Standings

Round Robin Results

Draw 2
November 11, 12:00 PM PT

Draw 3
November 11, 3:00 PM PT

Draw 4
November 11, 6:00 PM PT

Draw 5
November 11, 9:00 PM PT

Draw 6
November 12, 8:00 AM PT

Draw 7
November 12,11:00 AM PT

Draw 8
November 12, 3:00 PM PT

Tiebreaker
November 12, 9:00 PM PT

Playoffs

References

External links

2011 in curling
Vancouver Island Shootout
Sports competitions in Victoria, British Columbia